Hardinsburg is a town in Posey Township, Washington County, in the U.S. state of Indiana. The population was 248 at the 2010 census.

History
Hardinsburg was laid out in 1838 by Aaron Hardin, and named for him. Aaron Hardin operated the first store in Hardinsburg and had kept store for several years before the town was started. Hardinsburg was incorporated as a town in 1849.

The Hardinsburg post office has been in operation since 1838.

Geography

Demographics

2010 census
As of the census of 2010, there were 248 people, 96 households, and 61 families living in the town. The racial makeup of the town was 100.0% White. Hispanic or Latino of any race were 0.4% of the population.

There were 96 households, of which 35.4% had children under the age of 18 living with them, 49.0% were married couples living together, 8.3% had a female householder with no husband present, 6.3% had a male householder with no wife present, and 36.5% were non-families. 30.2% of all households were made up of individuals, and 8.4% had someone living alone who was 65 years of age or older. The average household size was 2.58 and the average family size was 3.26.

The median age in the town was 37 years. 26.6% of residents were under the age of 18; 9% were between the ages of 18 and 24; 25.1% were from 25 to 44; 28.3% were from 45 to 64; and 11.3% were 65 years of age or older. The gender makeup of the town was 50.0% male and 50.0% female.

2000 census
As of the census of 2000, there were 244 people, 99 households, and 66 families living in the town. The racial makeup of the town was 99.18% White, 0.82% from other races. Hispanic or Latino of any race were 4.10% of the population.

There were 99 households, out of which 38.4% had children under the age of 18 living with them, 45.5% were married couples living together, 15.2% had a female householder with no husband present, and 33.3% were non-families. 32.3% of all households were made up of individuals, and 17.2% had someone living alone who was 65 years of age or older. The average household size was 2.46 and the average family size was 3.09.

In the town, the population was spread out, with 33.2% under the age of 18, 4.1% from 18 to 24, 31.6% from 25 to 44, 18.9% from 45 to 64, and 12.3% who were 65 years of age or older. The median age was 35 years. For every 100 females, there were 89.1 males. For every 100 females age 18 and over, there were 85.2 males.

The median income for a household in the town was $23,125, and the median income for a family was $32,917. Males had a median income of $26,250 versus $22,813 for females. The per capita income for the town was $14,112. About 5.6% of families and 13.9% of the population were below the poverty line, including 21.7% of those under the age of eighteen and 20.0% of those 65 or over.

References

Towns in Indiana
Towns in Washington County, Indiana
Louisville metropolitan area
Populated places established in 1838
1838 establishments in Indiana